Following is a list of accidents and incidents Aeroflot experienced in the 1960s. In terms of fatalities, the accident ranks as the fifth worst involving an Il-18, .

The number of recorded fatalities aboard Aeroflot aircraft during the decade rose to 1801; likewise, 175 of its aircraft were written off in accidents or incidents, split into six Antonov An-10s, 13 Antonov An-12s, 54 Antonov An-2s, two Antonov An-6s, 8 Antonov An-24s, two Avia 14s, one Ilyushin Il-12, 22 Ilyushin Il-14s, 31 Ilyushin Il-18s, 12 Lisunov Li-2s, 14 Tupolev Tu-104s, two Tupolev Tu-114s, and five Tupolev Tu-124s. Most of the fatal accidents took place within the borders of the Soviet Union. 

Certain Western media conjectured that the Soviet government was reluctant to publicly admit the occurrence of such events, which might render these figures higher, as fatal events would have only been admitted when there were foreigners aboard the crashed aircraft, the accident took place in a foreign country, or they reached the news for some reason. However, no significant amount of unreported serious accidents have emerged after the dissolution of the USSR, in any of its then-constituent republics.

List

See also

Aeroflot accidents and incidents
Aeroflot accidents and incidents in the 1950s
Aeroflot accidents and incidents in the 1970s
Aeroflot accidents and incidents in the 1980s
Aeroflot accidents and incidents in the 1990s
Transport in the Soviet Union

Notes

References

Lists of aviation accidents and incidents

1960s in the Soviet Union